Scott House, also known as The Magnolia House, is a historic home located at Hampton, Virginia. It was built in 1889, and is a two-story, five-bay, stuccoed wood-frame Queen Anne style dwelling.  It has a steeply pitched cross-gable roof and features cornice dentils, a bracketed cornice, elaborate gable ornamentation, an art glass transom over the raised panel double door, and 14 fluted Doric order columns that support a wrap-around porch.

It was listed on the National Register of Historic Places in 1999.

References

Houses on the National Register of Historic Places in Virginia
Queen Anne architecture in Virginia
Houses completed in 1889
Houses in Hampton, Virginia
National Register of Historic Places in Hampton, Virginia